Mateo Pellegrino Casalánguida (born 22 October 2001) is a Spanish-born Argentine professional footballer who plays as a centre-forward for Estudiantes de La Plata, on loan from Vélez Sarsfield.

Club career
Pellegrino played in various youth academies across Europe due to his father's footballing commitments on the continent, with the centre-forward notably appearing for Valencia and Inter Milan. In 2018, Pellegrino joined the Vélez Sarsfield academy; a few years before his father would become manager at first-team level. He was promoted to the senior set-up for the first time in January 2021. He soon appeared on the substitute's bench for a Copa de la Liga Profesional fixture with Rosario Central on 16 January, though he went unused in a 3–1 away win. His debut arrived under father Mauricio in the same competition on 31 March against Banfield. On 27 June 2022, Pellegrino joined fellow league club Estudiantes on loan until June 2023 with a purchase option.

International career
September 2019 saw Pellegrino receive a training call-up from Fernando Batista's Argentina U19s.

Style of play
Before becoming a centre-forward, Pellegrino played as a left-back and as a winger. He cites Romelu Lukaku and Lucas Pratto as players who he shapes his game on.

Personal life
Pellegrino is the son of football manager and former footballer Mauricio Pellegrino, while uncle Maximiliano was also a professional footballer. He was born in Valencia, Spain while his father was playing in La Liga for the football club of the same name.

Career statistics
.

Notes

References

External links

2001 births
Living people
Footballers from Valencia (city)
Argentine footballers
Association football forwards
Argentine Primera División players
Club Atlético Vélez Sarsfield footballers
Estudiantes de La Plata footballers